The discography of PJ Harvey, an English alternative rock musician, consists of nine studio albums, two collaboration albums with John Parish, twenty-two singles, one extended play, three compilation albums and a number of collaborations with other artists.

Following her departure from Automatic Dlamini in January 1991, Harvey formed the PJ Harvey Trio. The trio, which included Rob Ellis and Steve Vaughan, released Dry in 1992 on the independent label Too Pure and later released Rid of Me in 1993 on major label Island. The trio split in late 1993 and Harvey continued as a solo artist under the same name. In 1995, she released To Bring You My Love, often considered to be her mainstream breakthrough, and the album charted in twelve countries worldwide upon its release. Between To Bring You My Love and its follow-up, Is This Desire? (1998), Harvey released the collaborative album Dance Hall at Louse Point (1996) with John Parish. Her fifth album, Stories from the City, Stories from the Sea, was released in 2000, received the Mercury Music Prize in 2001 and was considered by critics to be her magnum opus. In 2004, her sixth album, Uh Huh Her, was released and became Harvey's highest-charting album in the United States, peaking at number 29 in the Billboard 200. In 2007, her seventh album, White Chalk, was released and in 2009, Parish and Harvey released their second collaborative album, A Woman a Man Walked By. In 2011, her eighth studio album, Let England Shake, was released and received the Mercury Music Prize, making Harvey the only artist in history to have won the award twice and increasing record sales by over 1,100% overnight.

In the United Kingdom, five of Harvey's albums have been certified Silver, one certified Gold and one certified Platinum, amounting to total sales of over 800,000 copies. In the United States, her albums have collectively sold over 1.5 million copies as of 2007, according to Nielsen SoundScan.

Albums

Studio albums

Soundtrack albums

Demo albums

I  Limited edition versions of Dry included a second LP titled Demonstration, featuring acoustic demos.
II  Limited edition versions of To Bring You My Love included a bonus disc of b-sides.

Collaborative albums with John Parish

Compilation albums

Extended plays

Singles

As lead artist

As featured artist

Other appearances

Soundtracks

Tributes

Compilations

Other project

Collaborations 

I  Not the same song as "Water" featured on Dry.
II  Not the same song as "No Child of Mine" featured on Uh Huh Her, although the song incorporates elements of the PJ Harvey version.

Videography

Music videos

I  Two versions of the video for "Dress" were shot.

II  The previously unseen video for "Angelene" was officially released in 2020.

Video albums

References

External links
Official website
PJ Harvey at Island Records

Rock music discographies
Discographies of British artists